The Kingdom of Naples, also known as the Kingdom of Sicily, was a state that ruled the part of the Italian Peninsula south of the Papal States between 1282 and 1816. It was established by the War of the Sicilian Vespers (1282–1302), when the island of Sicily revolted and was conquered by the Crown of Aragon, becoming a separate kingdom also called the Kingdom of Sicily. This left the Neapolitan mainland under the possession of Charles of Anjou. Later, two competing lines of the Angevin family competed for the Kingdom of Naples in the late 14th century, which resulted in the death of Joan I by Charles III of Naples. Charles' daughter Joanna II adopted King Alfonso V of Aragon as heir, who would then unite Naples into his Aragonese dominions in 1442.

As part of the Italian Wars, France went to war with Aragon over the kingdom in 1502, the war ended in an Aragonese victory that left Ferdinand II in full control of the kingdom by 1504. The Spanish held control of Naples throughout the 17th century where it remained an important source of economic and military power for the Spanish Crown. After the War of the Spanish Succession in the early 18th century, the possession of the kingdom again changed hands; the 1714 Treaty of Rastatt saw Naples given to Charles VI of the Austrian Habsburgs. However, Naples and Sicily were conquered by Charles, Duke of Parma (of the Spanish Bourbons) during the War of the Polish Succession in 1734, he was then installed as King of Naples and Sicily from 1735. In 1816, Naples formally unified with the island of Sicily to form the Kingdom of the Two Sicilies.

The territory of the Kingdom of Naples corresponded to the current Italian regions of Campania, Calabria, Apulia, Basilicata, Abruzzo, Molise and also included some areas of today's southern and eastern Lazio.

Nomenclature

The term "Kingdom of Naples" is in near-universal use among historians, but it was not used officially by the government. Since the Angevins remained in power on the Italian peninsula, they kept the original name of the Kingdom of Sicily. At the end of the War of the Vespers, the Peace of Caltabellotta (1302) provided that the name of the kingdom would be Kingdom of Sicily  had become known colloquially as the Kingdom of Naples ( or ).

When both kingdoms came under the rule of Alfonso the Magnanimous in 1442, this usage became official, although Ferdinand I (1458–94) preferred the simple title King of Sicily.

In the 18th century, the Neapolitan intellectual Giuseppe Maria Galanti argued that Apulia was the true "national" name of the kingdom. By the time of Alfonso the Magnanimous, the two kingdoms were sufficiently distinct that they were no longer seen as divisions of a single kingdom. Despite being repeatedly in personal union, they remained administratively separate. In 1816, the two kingdoms finally merged to form the Kingdom of the Two Sicilies.

History

Background 

Naples, which was the capital of the Duchy of Naples since the 7th century, surrendered to Roger II of Sicily in 1137, and was annexed to the Kingdom of Sicily. The Normans were the first to bring political unity to southern Italy in the centuries after the failure of the Byzantine effort to reconquer Italy. The Normans established a kingdom that included southern mainland Italy and the island of Sicily, which was primarily ruled from Palermo. The title of King of Sicily was established by the Antipope Anacletus II as early as 1130 and subsequently legitimized, in 1139, by Pope Innocent II. Since the royal titles over the State had been assigned to the Normans by Innocent II, the popes, in particular Pope Innocent III and Pope Innocent IV, claimed the feudal rights of the Church State over the Kingdom. After Constance, Queen of Sicily married Henry VI, Holy Roman Emperor, the region was inherited by their son Frederick II, as King of Sicily. The region that later became the separate Kingdom of Naples under the Angevins formed part of the Kingdom of Sicily, which included the island of Sicily and Apulia.

Angevin dynasty 

Following the rebellion in 1282, King Charles I of Sicily (Charles of Anjou) was forced to leave the island of Sicily by Peter III of Aragon's troops. Charles, however, maintained his possessions on the mainland, customarily known as the "Kingdom of Naples", after its capital city.

Charles and his Angevin successors maintained a claim to Sicily, warring against the Aragonese until 1373, when Queen Joan I of Naples formally renounced the claim by the Treaty of Villeneuve. Joan's reign was contested by Louis the Great, the Angevin King of Hungary, who captured the kingdom several times (1348–1352).

Queen Joan I also played a part in the ultimate demise of the first Kingdom of Naples. As she was childless, she adopted Louis I, Duke of Anjou, as her heir, in spite of the claims of her cousin, the Prince of Durazzo, effectively setting up a junior Angevin line in competition with the senior line. This led to Joan I's murder at the hands of the Prince of Durazzo in 1382, and his seizing of the throne as Charles III of Naples.

The two competing Angevin lines contested each other for the possession of the Kingdom of Naples over the following decades.  In 1389 Louis II of Anjou son of Louis I managed to seize the throne from Ladislas of Naples son of Charles III, but was expelled by Ladislas in 1399. Charles III's daughter Joanna II (r. 1414–1435) adopted Alfonso V of Aragon (whom she later repudiated) and Louis III of Anjou as heirs alternately, finally settling succession on Louis' brother René of Anjou of the junior Angevin line, and he succeeded her in 1435.

René of Anjou temporarily united the claims of junior and senior Angevin lines. In 1442, however, Alfonso V conquered the Kingdom of Naples and unified Sicily and Naples once again as dependencies of Aragon. At his death in 1458, the War of the Neapolitan Succession (1458–1462) erupted, after which the kingdom was again separated and Naples was inherited by Ferrante, Alfonso's illegitimate son.

Aragonese dynasty 

When Ferrante died in 1494, Charles VIII of France invaded Italy, using as a pretext the Angevin claim to the throne of Naples, which his father had inherited in 1481 on the will of Charles IV of Anjou, nephew and heir of King René who had no surviving son. This began the Italian Wars.

Charles VIII expelled Alfonso II of Naples from Naples in 1495, but was soon forced to withdraw due to the support of Ferdinand II of Aragon for his cousin, Alfonso II's son Ferrantino. Ferrantino was restored to the throne but died in 1496 and was succeeded by his uncle, Frederick IV.

Charles VIII's successor, Louis XII reiterated the French claim. In 1501, he occupied Naples and partitioned the kingdom with Ferdinand of Aragon, who abandoned his cousin King Frederick. However, disputes over ownership of key Neapolitan territories made the deal quickly fall through, and Aragon and France resumed their war over the kingdom in 1502. The Spanish troops occupying Calabria and Apulia, led by Gonzalo Fernandez de Cordova, invaded and expelled all Frenchmen from the area. The resulting Aragonese victory left Ferdinand in full control of the kingdom by 1504.

The peace treaties that continued were never definitive, but they established at least that the title of King of Naples was reserved for Ferdinand's grandson, the future Charles V, Holy Roman Emperor. Ferdinand nevertheless continued in possession of the kingdom, being considered the legitimate heir of his uncle Alfonso I of Naples (Alfonso V of Aragon) and also to the former Kingdom of Sicily (Regnum Utriusque Siciliae).

The kingdom continued to be disputed between France and Spain for the next several decades, but French efforts to gain control of it became feebler as the decades went on, and never genuinely endangered Spanish control.

The French finally abandoned their claims to Naples by the Treaty of Cateau-Cambrésis in 1559. In the Treaty of London (1557), five cities on the coast of Tuscany were designated the Stato dei Presidi (State of the Presidi), and part of the Kingdom of Naples.

As the most populous holding of the Spanish Empire outside of Castile itself (with 3 million inhabitants in 1600), Naples remained an important source of economic and military power for the Spanish. Heavy taxation was levied upon the kingdom to pay for Spain's wars, especially after 1580. Beyond dispatching troops to fight the Eighty Years' War in the Low Countries, Naples also disbursed a third of the military expenditures accruing to Lombardy and paid for the Spanish garrisons in Tuscany. This all costed them 800,000 ducats annually, or about a third of the kingdom's revenues; moreover, the public debt also had a military origin, and interest payments on it devoured 40 percent of all tax income. Naples was rich enough to redeem the debt and pay an attractive ten percent in full to lenders. While the soldiers of Naples were under the command of the Spanish viceroy, Neapolitan nobles enjoyed ascendancy in the assemblies and committees that financed and administered the army.

The kingdom suffered a heavy burden from the Franco-Spanish War (1635–1659). From 1631 to 1636 alone, Naples sent 53,500 soldiers and 3.5 million scudi to support the Spanish king. This was actually more than was raised in the same time by Castile, which had a population twice the size. Naples provided and paid for 10,000 troops and 1,000 horses annually from 1630 to 1643, on top of a 1 million ducat annual subsidy for the war effort and more funds and soldiers for the kingdom's garrisons and navy. The kingdom was increasingly forced to revert to borrowing to finance the war as it went on, which it could do due to its good credit. From 1612 to 1646, Neapolitan taxes tripled and the public debt quintupled, and 57 percent of the kingdom's revenue was devoted to interest payments. Spain's wars crushed the Neapolitan economy. Furthermore, 90 percent of taxes were collected by state creditors, meaning the state paid an effective interest rate of 70 percent annually on the money it borrowed to fight the war. The kingdom started selling state assets to anyone willing to buy them, which usually ended up being barons; these assets included prisons, forests, buildings, and even royal fortresses, as well as titles.

Spanish rule under the Habsburgs and Bourbons 
After the War of the Spanish Succession in the early 18th century, possession of the kingdom again changed hands. Under the terms of the Treaty of Rastatt in 1714, Naples was given to Charles VI, the Holy Roman Emperor. He also gained control of Sicily in 1720, but Austrian rule did not last long. Both Naples and Sicily were conquered by a Spanish army during the War of the Polish Succession in 1734, and Charles, Duke of Parma, a younger son of King Philip V of Spain, the first member of the French House of Bourbon to rule in Spain, was installed as King of Naples and Sicily from 1735. When Charles inherited the Spanish throne from his older half-brother in 1759, he left Naples and Sicily to his younger son, Ferdinand IV. Despite the two Kingdoms being in a personal union under the Habsburg and Bourbon dynasties, they remained constitutionally separate.

Being a member of the House of Bourbon, Ferdinand IV was a natural opponent of the French Revolution and Napoleon. On 29 November 1798, he effectively started the War of the Second Coalition by briefly occupying Rome, but was expelled from it by French Revolutionary forces within the year and safely returned home. Soon afterwards, on 23 December 1798, Ferdinand fled Naples to Palermo, Sicily as a French army closed in. In January 1799, the French armies installed a Parthenopaean Republic, but this proved short-lived, and a peasant counter-revolution inspired by the clergy allowed Ferdinand to return to his capital. However, in 1801 Ferdinand was compelled to make important concessions to the French by the Treaty of Florence, which reinforced France's position as the dominant power in mainland Italy.

Napoleonic kingdom 

Ferdinand's decision to ally with the Third Coalition against Napoleon in 1805 proved more damaging. In 1806, following decisive victories over the allied armies at Austerlitz and over the Neapolitans at Campo Tenese, Napoleon installed his brother, Joseph as King of Naples, he conferred the title "Prince of Naples" to be hereditary on his children and grandchildren. When Joseph was sent off to Spain two years later, he was replaced by Napoleon's sister Caroline and his brother-in-law Marshal Joachim Murat, as King of the Two Sicilies.

Meanwhile, Ferdinand had fled to Sicily, where he retained his throne, despite successive attempts by Murat to invade the island. The British would defend Sicily for the remainder of the war but despite the Kingdom of Sicily nominally being part of the Fourth, Fifth and Sixth Coalitions against Napoleon, Ferdinand and the British were unable to ever challenge French control of the Italian mainland.

After Napoleon's defeat in 1814, Murat reached an agreement with Austria and was allowed to retain the throne of Naples, despite the lobbying efforts of Ferdinand and his supporters. However, with most of the other powers, particularly Britain, hostile towards him and dependent on the uncertain support of Austria, Murat's position became less and less secure. Therefore, when Napoleon returned to France for the Hundred Days in 1815, Murat once again sided with him. Realising the Austrians would soon attempt to remove him, Murat gave the Rimini Proclamation hoping to save his kingdom by allying himself with Italian nationalists.

The ensuing Neapolitan War between Murat and the Austrians was short, ending with a decisive victory for the Austrian forces at the Battle of Tolentino. Murat was forced to flee, and Ferdinand IV of Sicily was restored to the throne of Naples. Murat would attempt to regain his throne but was quickly captured and executed by firing squad in Pizzo, Calabria. The next year, 1816, finally saw the formal union of the Kingdom of Naples with the Kingdom of Sicily into the new Kingdom of the Two Sicilies.

Scientists and philosophers raised by the Kingdom of Naples 
 Trotula (11th-12th century), Early representative and pioneer of women's medicine
 Trota of Salerno (12th-13th century), doctor 
 Barlaam of Seminera (1290-1348), mathematician and philosopher
 Luca Gaurico (1475-1558), astronomer and mathematician
 Bartolomeo Maranta (1500-1571),  physician and botanist
 Giovanni Filippo Ingrassia (1510-1580), the anatomist  who discovered the sadness
 Aloysius Lilius (1510-1576), mathematician and astronomer One of the founders of the Julian calendar
 Giambattista della Porta (1535-1615), Renaissance sage, physician and botanist, His first and internationally renowned work was Magia Naturalis.
 Giordano Bruno (1548-1600), mathematician, astronomer, physicist, philosopher whose theories predict modern science, and the knowledgeable
 Fabio Colonna (1567-1640), botanist 

 Marco Aurelio Severino (1580-1656), The First Test of Surgical Pathology". He was also the first to include drawings of pathological lesions in his books.
 Giovanni Battista Zupi (1590-1650), The astronomer who discovered that Mercury has orbital stages.
 Giovanni Battista Hodierna (1597-1660), astronomer 
 Giovanni Alfonso Borelli (1608-1679), physicist and mathematician, He contributed to the principle of modern scientific inquiry by continuing Galileo's practice of testing hypotheses against observation. Having studied mathematics, Borelli also did extensive work on the moons of Jupiter, the mechanics of animal movements, and microscopically on the components of blood. He also used microscopy to investigate the stomamovement of plants and conducted studies in the field of medicine and geology.
 Agostino Scilla (1609-1650), the archaeologist who initiated the modern scientific study of fossils
 Leonardo Ximenes (1716-1786), mathematician, astronomer, physicist, geographer, engineer 
 Domenico Cotugno (1736-1822), He was a Neapolitan physician and the first to provide the definitions of cerebrospinal fluid (CSF) and sciatica."
 Tiberius Cavollo (1746-1809), physicist, natural philosopher, inventor, scientist conducting electrical experiments
Giuseppe Saverio Poli (1746–1825), physicist, biology, natural historian 
Annibale de Gasparis (1819-1892), He was an Italian astronomer known for his discovery of asteroids and his contributions to theoretical astronomy.
Vincenzo Cerulli (1859–1927), he was an astronomer. "He was especially known for his work on Mars and Venus and his discovery of the planetary 704 Interamnia.

Flags

See also 
 History of Naples
 List of monarchs of Naples

References

Bibliography 
 : vol. 1, vol. 2 (reprinted in one volume with a new introduction by John Davis as The History of the Kingdom of Naples: From the Accession of Charles of Bourbon to the Death of Ferdinand I, London: Tauris, 2009)
 
  (English translation of the revised 3rd edn. (1953) of Storia del regno di Napoli, 1st edn. Bari: Laterza, 1925)
 
 
 
 
 
 
 
 
 
 
 
 
 
 

 
History of Naples
Naples
Naples
1282 establishments in Europe
13th-century establishments in Italy
Italian Renaissance
1816 disestablishments in Italy
1816 disestablishments in Europe
States and territories disestablished in 1816
Early Modern period
Former monarchies of Europe
Former countries